Radovan Samardžić (Sarajevo, 22 October 1922 – Belgrade, 1 February 1994) was a Yugoslav and Serbian historian, member of the Serbian Academy of Sciences and Arts (SANU).

He successfully defended his doctoral dissertation on the history of Dubrovnik in 1956. As a pupil of French historian, Fernand Braudel, Samardžić, throughout of his career, focused on research of Ottoman history.

Selected works

See also
List of Serbian historians

References

External links

1922 births
1994 deaths
20th-century Serbian historians
Yugoslav historians
Writers from Sarajevo
Serbs of Bosnia and Herzegovina
20th-century Bosnia and Herzegovina historians